The Consolations of the Forest: Alone in a Cabin on the Siberian Taiga is a 2011 book by the French writer Sylvain Tesson. Its French title is Dans les forêts de Sibérie, which means "in the forests of Siberia". It recounts how Tesson lived isolated for six months, from February to July 2010, in a cabin in Siberia, on the northwestern shore of Lake Baikal. An English translation by Linda Coverdale was published in 2013.

Accolades
The book was awarded the Prix Médicis essai. It was the runner-up for the Prix Renaudot, losing to Emmanuel Carrère's Limonov. The English translation received the 2014 Dolman Best Travel Book Award.

Adaptation
The book is the basis for the 2016 film In the Forests of Siberia, directed by Safy Nebbou and starring Raphaël Personnaz.

References

External links
 Publicity page at Éditions Gallimard's website 

2011 non-fiction books
Autobiographies adapted into films
French autobiographies
French travel books
French-language books
Lake Baikal
Works set in Siberia
Works by Sylvain Tesson
Éditions Gallimard books